Making Movies is the third studio album by British rock band Dire Straits released on 17 October 1980 by Vertigo Records internationally, Warner Bros. Records in the United States and Mercury Records in Canada. The album includes the single "Romeo and Juliet", which reached #8 on the UK Singles Chart, as well as “Tunnel of Love,” featured in the 1982 Richard Gere film An Officer and a Gentleman.

Making Movies reached number one on the album charts in Italy and Norway, number 19 in the United States and number 4 in the United Kingdom. Making Movies was later certified platinum in the United States and double-platinum in the United Kingdom. It's regarded as one of Dire Straits’ best albums.

Background
After Dire Straits' Communiqué Tour ended on 21 December 1979 in London, Mark Knopfler spent the first half of 1980 writing the songs for the band's next album. He contacted Jimmy Iovine after hearing Iovine's production on the song "Because the Night" by Patti Smith—a song co-written by Smith and Bruce Springsteen. Iovine had also worked on Springsteen's Born to Run and Darkness on the Edge of Town albums, and he was instrumental in recruiting E-Street Band keyboardist Roy Bittan for the Making Movies sessions.

Making Movies was recorded at the Power Station in New York from 20 June to 25 August 1980. Jimmy Iovine and Mark Knopfler produced the album.

David Knopfler left Dire Straits in August 1980 during the recording of the album, following heated arguments with his brother.  His guitar tracks were almost complete for the album, but were re-recorded by Mark. David appears on video playing "Solid Rock" and "Les Boys" live in concert, but these performances preceded the recording. The album sessions continued with Sid McGinnis on rhythm guitar, although he was uncredited on the album. Dire Straits expanded into a quintet when keyboard player Alan Clark and Californian guitarist Hal Lindes were recruited as full-time group members shortly after the album's release in October 1980.

Four songs were recorded during the sessions but not released on the album: "Making Movies," "Suicide Towers," "Twisting by the Pool" and "Sucker for Punishment." "Twisting by the Pool" was released on the ExtendedancEPlay EP on 10 January 1983 and reached the UK Top 20 when released as a single. The title of the album is taken from a line in the song "Skateaway" and from the outtake "Making Movies."

Release
Making Movies was released on 17 October 1980 on LP and cassette formats. In 1981, an identically named short film was released on VHS and Beta, as well as screened in some theatrical venues, consisting of three music videos directed by fashion/commercial photographer Lester Bookbinder, for "Romeo and Juliet," "Tunnel of Love" and "Skateaway." The original CD version was released in 1984.

The album was remastered and reissued on CD with the rest of the Dire Straits catalogue in 1996 internationally, and on 19 September 2000 in the United States.

The album's primary single was "Romeo and Juliet" which reached number 8 in the UK singles chart in early 1981. The second single release was "Skateaway," and the third and final single from the album was the lengthy opening track, "Tunnel of Love," with its intro "The Carousel Waltz" by Richard Rodgers and Oscar Hammerstein II, which only reached the number 54 position in the UK. However, it remains one of Knopfler's most popular compositions.

With new group members Alan Clark and Hal Lindes on board, Dire Straits embarked on tours of Europe, North America, and Oceania from October 1980 until July 1981 to promote the album.

Three of the seven tracks from Making Movies continued to be played throughout the Love over Gold, Brothers in Arms and On Every Street tours: “Romeo and Juliet”, “Tunnel of Love” and “Solid Rock”, while “Expresso Love” was played in all concert tours until 1986.

Critical reception

In his retrospective review for AllMusic, Stephen Thomas Erlewine gave the album four and a half out of five stars, noting that Making Movies "ranks among the band's finest work."

In his review for Rolling Stone, David Fricke gave the album four out of five stars, writing:

Rolling Stone ranked Making Movies number 52 in their survey of the 100 Best Albums of the Eighties.

Track listing
All songs were written by Mark Knopfler, except where indicated.

Personnel 
Dire Straits
 Mark Knopfler – vocals, guitars
 John Illsley – bass, vocals
 Pick Withers – drums, vocals

Additional musicians
 Roy Bittan – keyboards
 Sid McGinnis – guitars (uncredited)

Production 
 Jimmy Iovine – producer
 Mark Knopfler – producer
 Shelly Yakus – engineer
 Jeff Hendrickson – assistant engineer
 Jon Mathias – assistant engineer
 Greg Calbi – mastering at Sterling Sound (New York City, New York)
 Bob Ludwig – remastering
 Neil Terk – original design and artwork
 John Illsley – artwork 
 Brian Griffin – photography

Charts

Weekly charts

Year-end charts

Certifications and sales

References
Notes

Citations

External links
Making Movies at Mark Knopfler's website

1980 albums
Albums produced by Jimmy Iovine
Albums produced by Mark Knopfler
Dire Straits albums
Vertigo Records albums
Warner Records albums